Øivind Christensen (10 October 1899 – 21 July 1988) was a Norwegian sailor. He was born in Aker. He competed at the 1960 Summer Olympics in Rome, coming fourth in the Dragon class, together with Arild Amundsen and Carl Otto Svae.

References

External links

1899 births
1988 deaths
Sportspeople from Oslo
Norwegian male sailors (sport)
Olympic sailors of Norway
Sailors at the 1936 Summer Olympics – Star
Sailors at the 1948 Summer Olympics – Swallow
Sailors at the 1960 Summer Olympics – Dragon